Ihemeje is a Nigerian surname. Notable people with the surname include:

 Emmanuel Ihemeje (born 1998), Italian athlete

surnames
Surnames of Nigerian origin